United States National Championships may refer to:
Badminton: U.S. National Badminton Championships
Curling: United States Men's Curling Championship, United States Women's Curling Championship
Cycling: United States National Road Race Championships, United States National Cyclo-cross Championships, United States National Mountain Bike Championships
Dance: United States Dance Championships
Figure Skating: U. S. Figure Skating Championships
Gymnastics: USA Gymnastics National Championships
Skiing: U.S. National Ski Jumping Championships
Soccer (Association football): U.S. Open Cup
Swimming: United States Swimming National Championships
Tennis: US Open (tennis), U.S. National Indoor Championships
Track & Field: USA Outdoor Track and Field Championships
Yo-Yo: U.S. National Yo-Yo Contest